Felix and Regula are Coptic Orthodox and Roman Catholic saints, together with their servant Exuperantius, and are the patron saints of Zürich, their feast day being 11 September in the Gregorian calendar,  celebrated on the same day using the Julian calendar (which is the 24th of September Gregorian), the 14th of Tout in the Coptic Calendar. 

Felix and Regula were siblings, beheaded in the third century, along with their loyal servant Exuperantius, for converting to Christianity.

History
Felix and Regula were siblings, and members of the Theban legion under Saint Maurice, stationed in Agaunum in the Valais. When the legion was to be executed in 286, they fled, reaching Zürich via Glarus before they were caught, tried and executed. After decapitation, they miraculously stood to their feet, picked up their own heads, walked forty paces uphill, and prayed before lying down in death. They were buried on the spot where they lay down, on the hilltop which would become the site of the Grossmünster.

The story was revealed in a dream to a monk called Florentius. 
It largely contributed to the massive conversion of the inhabitants of these regions to Christianity and had such an impact on Zurich that these three saints still appear on the seal of Zurich today.

In the 9th century, there was a small monastery at the location, outside the settlement of Zürich which was situated on the left side of the Limmat. The Grossmünster was built on their graves from ca. 1100, while at the site of their execution stands the  Wasserkirche. From the 13th century, images of the saints were used in official seals of the city and on coins. On the saints' feast day, their relics were carried in procession between the Grossmünster and the Fraumünster, and the two monasteries vied for possession of the relics, which attracted enough pilgrims to make Zürich the most important pilgrimage site in the bishopric of Konstanz. The Knabenschiessen of Zürich originates with the feast day of the saints on 11 September, which came to be the "national holiday" of the early modern Republic of Zürich.

With the dissolution of the monasteries by Huldrych Zwingli in 1524, their possessions were confiscated and the graves of the martyrs were opened. There are conflicting versions of what happened then. Heinrich Bullinger claims that the graves were empty save for a few bone fragments, which were piously buried in the common graveyard outside the church. The Catholics, on the other hand, claimed that the reformers were planning to throw the relics of the saints into the river, and that a courageous man of Uri (who happened to be exiled from Uri, and by his action earned amnesty) stole the relics from the church and carried them to Andermatt, where the two skulls of Felix and Regula can be seen to this day, while the remaining relics were returned to Zürich in 1950, to the newly built Catholic church St. Felix und Regula. The skulls have been Carbon 14 dated, and while one dates to the Middle Ages, the other is in fact composed of fragments of two separate skulls, of which one is medieval, and the other could indeed date to Roman times.

Literature (in German) 
 Hansueli Etter, Urs Baur, Jürg Hanser, Jürg Schneider (Hrsg.): Die Zürcher Stadtheiligen Felix und Regula. Legenden, Reliquien, Geschichte und ihre Botschaft im Licht moderner Forschung. Hochbauamt der Stadt Zürich/Büro für Archäologie, Zürich 1988 
 Walter Nigg: Felix und Regula, Aneignung einer Legende. Zürich: SV International, Schweizer Verlagshaus, 1983. 
 Jürg Hanser, Armin Mathis, Ulrich Ruoff, Jürg Schneider: Das neue Bild des Alten Zürich. Zürich 1983
 Cécile Ramer, Felix, Regula und Exuperantius; Ikonographie der Stifts- und Stadtheiligen Zürichs. Zürich: Antiquarische Gesellschaft, 1973.

See also
 Saints Felix and Regula, patron saint archive

References

External links

 CPG 111, 1470s manuscript containing the legend of Felix and Regula as well as that of Saint Meinrad.
 University of Zürich: «Die Stadt Zürich und ihre Märtyrer – ein multimedialer Pfad» 
 Orthodox Vesper in honor of St. Felix, St. Regula and St. Exuperantius
 Saints Germain et Randoald, Martyrs

286 deaths
3rd-century Christian martyrs
3rd-century Christian saints
Regula
Cephalophores
Saints from Roman Egypt
History of Zürich
Sibling duos
Roman Catholic saints